Yajurvindra Singh  (born 1 August 1952) is a former Indian cricketer who played in four Test matches from 1977 to 1979. He is from the erstwhile princely family of Bilkha, in Junagadh district in Saurashtra. Yajurvindra Singh, known as 'Sunny' since childhood, studied at the elite Rajkumar College in Rajkot, where he captained his School Team at the same at the same time that Karsan Ghavri, who hailed from Rajkot, and who eventually went on to play for the Indian team, captained the Virani High School team. The two often played against each other at local school fixtures.

He co-holds two Test fielding records: 5 catches in an innings, and 7 in a match.

References

External links

1952 births
Living people
People from Rajkot
Cricketers from Gujarat
India Test cricketers
Indian cricketers
West Zone cricketers
Saurashtra cricketers
Maharashtra cricketers